The 1951 Grand National was the 105th renewal of the Grand National horse race that took place at Aintree Racecourse near Liverpool, England, on 7 April 1951.

A crowd of 250,000 people saw the race won by Nickel Coin at odds of 40/1. The nine-year-old mare was ridden by jockey John Bullock and trained by Jack O'Donoghue. Royal Tan, who won in 1954, finished second, and Derrinstown was third. An unprecedented twelve horses (a third of the field) went at the first fence- either falling or being brought down. Of the 36 runners, only three completed the course. All of the horses returned safely to the stables.

In the long history of the Grand National only 13 mares have won the race, Nickel Coin being the most recent.

Finishing order

Non-finishers

Media Coverage
With rationing still in place across the UK, newspapers had limited space for coverage of the race, most only running a brief preview with the race card. The Radio Times carried a picture of 1950 winner, Freebooter jumping the final flight on the way to victory with a map of the course on its cover.

The BBC had requested to screen the race live on Television but Aintree refused, leaving the BBC light radio programme to issue a thirty-minute broadcast at 3pm. David Black called the runners over the early fences, Michael O'Hehir took over at Becher's and Canal turn with Richard North calling them up the Canal Side before handing over to lead commentator, Raymond Glendenning to call the runners home. Each commentator was assisted by a race caller who would spot and identify horses departing the contest. Peter O'Sullevan, who would eventually be known as the voice of Racing, this year acted as O'Hehir's caller.

The major newsreel companies regarded the National as one of the major highlights of their year. Movietone, presented by Lionel Gamlin, Pathe and Gaumont, all had cameras on the course and had their coverage ready to be screened in cinemas within hours.

References

 1951
Grand National
Grand National
Grand National
20th century in Lancashire